Hambastegi (in Persian همبستگی lit. Correlation) is an Iranian daily newspaper, published in Tehran as the official mouthpiece for Islamic Iran Solidarity Party.

Profile
Hambastegi was started in 2000. It had a reformist stance in the 2000s and supports the reformist Islamic Iran Solidarity Party. Among its contributors: Masih Alinejad, Nikahang Kowsar, Roozbeh Mirebrahimi, Abdolreza Tajik. Board members have included Fayaz Zahed.

See also
List of newspapers in Iran

References

2000 establishments in Iran
Newspapers published in Tehran
Persian-language newspapers
Newspapers established in 2000